James Henry Cotton (July 1, 1935 – March 16, 2017) was an American blues harmonica player, singer and songwriter, who performed and recorded with many fellow blues artists and with his own band. He also played drums early in his career.

Cotton began his professional career playing the blues harp in Howlin' Wolf's band in the early 1950s. He made his first recordings in Memphis for Sun Records, under the direction of Sam Phillips. In 1955, he was recruited by Muddy Waters to come to Chicago and join his band. Cotton became Muddy's bandleader and stayed with the group until 1965. In 1965, he formed the Jimmy Cotton Blues Quartet, with Otis Spann on piano, to record between gigs with the Muddy Waters band. He eventually left to form his own full-time touring group. His first full album, on Verve Records, was produced by the guitarist Mike Bloomfield and the singer and songwriter Nick Gravenites, who later were members of the band Electric Flag.

In the 1970s, Cotton played harmonica on Muddy Waters' Grammy Award–winning 1977 album Hard Again, produced by Johnny Winter.

Career
Cotton was born in Tunica, Mississippi. He became interested in music when he first heard Sonny Boy Williamson II on the radio. He left home with his uncle and moved to West Helena, Arkansas, finding Williamson there. For many years Cotton claimed that he told Williamson that he was an orphan and that Williamson took him in and raised him, a story he admitted in recent years is not true. However, Williamson did mentor Cotton during his early years. Williamson left the South to live with his estranged wife in Milwaukee, Wisconsin, leaving his band in Cotton's hands. Cotton was quoted as saying, "He just gave it to me. But I couldn't hold it together 'cause I was too young and crazy in those days an' everybody in the band was grown men, so much older than me."

Cotton played drums early in his career but is famous for his harmonica playing. He began his professional career playing the blues harp in Howlin' Wolf's band in the early 1950s. He made his first recordings as a solo artist for Sun Records in Memphis in 1953. In 1954, he recorded an electric blues single "Cotton Crop Blues", which featured a heavily distorted power chord–driven electric guitar solo by Pat Hare. Cotton began working with the Muddy Waters Band around 1955. He performed songs such as "Got My Mojo Working" and "She's Nineteen Years Old", although he did not play on the original recordings; Little Walter, Waters's long-time harmonica player, played for most of Waters's recording sessions in the 1950s. Cotton's first recording session with Waters took place in June 1957, and he alternated with Little Walter on Waters's recording sessions until the end of the decade.

In 1965 he formed the Jimmy Cotton Blues Quartet, with Otis Spann on piano, to record between gigs with Waters's band. Their performances were captured by producer Samuel Charters on volume two of the Vanguard recording Chicago/The Blues/Today! After leaving Waters's band in 1966, Cotton toured with Janis Joplin while pursuing a solo career. He formed the James Cotton Blues Band in 1967. The band mainly performed its own arrangements of popular blues and R&B from the 1950s and 1960s. Cotton's band included a horn section, like that of Bobby Bland's. After Bland's death, his son told news media that Bland had recently discovered that Cotton was his half-brother. 

In the 1970s, Cotton recorded several albums for Buddah Records. He played harmonica on Waters's Grammy Award–winning 1977 album Hard Again, produced by Johnny Winter. In the 1980s he recorded for Alligator Records in Chicago; he rejoined the Alligator roster in 2010. The James Cotton Blues Band received a Grammy nomination in 1984 for Live from Chicago: Mr. Superharp Himself!, on Alligator, and a second for his 1987 album Take Me Back, on Blind Pig Records. He was awarded a Grammy for Best Traditional Blues Album for Deep in the Blues in 1996, produced by John Snyder. Cotton appeared on the cover of the July–August 1987 issue of Living Blues magazine (number 76). He was featured in the same publication's 40th anniversary issue of August–September 2010.

In 2006, Cotton was inducted into the Blues Hall of Fame at a ceremony conducted by the Blues Foundation in Memphis. He has won or shared ten Blues Music Awards.

Cotton battled throat cancer in the mid-1990s, but he continued to tour, using singers or members of his backing band as vocalists. On March 10, 2008, he and Ben Harper performed at the induction of Little Walter into the Rock and Roll Hall of Fame, playing "Juke" and "My Babe" together; the induction ceremony was broadcast nationwide on VH1 Classic. On August 30, 2010, Cotton was the special guest on Larry Monroe's farewell broadcast of Blue Monday, which he hosted on radio station KUT in Austin, Texas, for nearly 30 years.

Cotton's studio album Giant, released by Alligator Records in late September 2010, was nominated for a Grammy Award. His album Cotton Mouth Man, released by Alligator on May 7, 2013, was also a Grammy nominee. It includes guest appearances by Gregg Allman, Joe Bonamassa, Ruthie Foster, Delbert McClinton, Warren Haynes, Keb Mo, Chuck Leavell and Colin Linden. Cotton played harmonica on "Matches Don't Burn Memories" on the debut album by the Dr. Izzy Band, Blind & Blues Bound, released in June 2013. In 2014, Cotton won a Blues Music Award for Traditional Male Blues Artist and was also nominated in the category Best Instrumentalist – Harmonica.

Cotton's touring band included the guitarist and vocalist Tom Holland, the vocalist Darrell Nulisch, the bassist Noel Neal (brother of the blues guitarist and harmonica player Kenny Neal) and the drummer Jerry Porter.

Death
Cotton died of pneumonia on March 16, 2017, at the age of 81, at a medical center in Austin, Texas and was buried on July 11, 2017 in Texas State Cemetery in Austin.

Musical company
Cotton had worked with many prominent artists, including:

 Gregg Allman
 William "Billy Boy" Arnold
 Elvin Bishop
 Mike Bloomfield
 Joe Bonamassa
 Paul Butterfield
 Grateful Dead
 Pat Hare
 Howlin' Wolf
 Janis Joplin
 B.B. King
 Freddie King
 Alexis Korner
 Steve Miller
 Charlie Musselwhite
 Quicksilver Messenger Service
 Keith Richards
 Todd Rundgren
 Santana
 Willie "Big Eyes" Smith
 Otis Spann
 Taj Mahal
 Big Mama Thornton
 Jimmie Vaughan
 Joe Louis Walker
 Muddy Waters
 Sonny Boy Williamson
 Johnny Winter

Discography

 1965: Chris Barber Presents Jimmy Cotton, and Chris Barber Presents Jimmy Cotton – 2 (two separate 45rpm EPs with Barber's British jazz and blues band) 
 1966: Chicago/The Blues/Today!, vol. 2 (Vanguard)
 1967: Seems Like Yesterday Live @ New Penelope Cafe, Montreal, Canada ( Just A Memory JAM 9138-2)
 1967: The James Cotton Blues Band (Verve)
 1968: Cut You Loose! (Vanguard)
 1968: Pure Cotton (Verve)
 1968: Cotton in Your Ears (Verve)
 1970: Taking Care of Business (Capitol)
 1974: 100% Cotton, with Matt "Guitar" Murphy (Buddah)
 1975: High Energy (Buddah)
 1976: Live & on the Move (Buddah)
 1984: High Compression (Alligator)
 1986: Live from Chicago: Mr. Superharp Himself (Alligator)
 1987: Take Me Back (Blind Pig), reissued on vinyl, 2009
 1988: Live at Antone's (Antone's)
 1990: Harp Attack!, with Carey Bell, Junior Wells, and Billy Branch (Alligator)
 1991: Mighty Long Time (Anton's)
 1994: 3 Harp Boogie (Tomato)
 1994: Living the Blues (Verve)
 1995: Two Sides of the Blues
 1995: The Best of the Verve Years (Verve)
 1996: Deep in the Blues (Verve)
 1998: Seems Like Yesterday (Justin Time)
 1998: Late Night Blues: Live at the Penelope Café 1967 (Justin Time)
 1999: Best of the Vanguard Years (Vanguard)
 1999: Superharps, with Charlie Musselwhite, Sugar Ray Norcia, and Billy Branch (Telarc)
 2000: Fire Down Under the Hill (Telarc)
 2002: 35th Anniversary Jam (Telarc)
 2004: Baby, Don't You Tear My Clothes (Telarc)
 2007: Breakin' It Up, Breakin' It Down, with Muddy Waters and Johnny Winter (Legacy)
 2010: Giant (Alligator)
 2013: Cotton Mouth Man (Alligator)
With Muddy Waters
Muddy Waters Sings "Big Bill" (Chess, 1960)
At Newport 1960 (Chess, 1960)
Muddy, Brass & the Blues (Chess, 1966)
Live at Mr. Kelly's (Chess, 1971)
Can't Get No Grindin' (Chess, 1973)
With Otis Spann
The Blues Never Die! (Prestige, 1965)
Otis Spann's Chicago Blues (Testament, 1966)

See also
 Chicago Blues Festival

References

External links
 [ Allmusic]
 
 
 James Cotton discography from Music City
 His official website
  Cotton Austin Trim
[ Review of Breakin' It Up Breakin' It Down CD on Allmusic.com]
  Hondarribia blues festival
 PBS American Roots Music Oral History
NAMM Oral History Program Interview

1935 births
2017 deaths
People from Tunica, Mississippi
Country blues musicians
American blues harmonica players
American blues singers
American blues singer-songwriters
American bandleaders
Blues musicians from Mississippi
Chicago blues musicians
Grammy Award winners
Harmonica blues musicians
Sun Records artists
Vanguard Records artists
People from West Helena, Arkansas
Singer-songwriters from Illinois
Singer-songwriters from Mississippi
Singer-songwriters from Arkansas
Deaths from pneumonia in Texas
Burials at Texas State Cemetery
Blind Pig Records artists
Alligator Records artists